Klobučar is a Croatian and Slovenian surname (from klobučar, "hatter") and toponym, which may refer to:

People with the surname
 Anđelko Klobučar (1931–2016), Croatian composer, organist and professor
 Berislav Klobučar (1924–2014), Croatian opera conductor
 Jaka Klobučar (born 1987), Slovenian professional basketball player
 Jan Klobučar (born 1992), Slovenian volleyball player
 Mira Klobučar (1888–1956), Croatian painter

Geography 
 Klobučar (island), uninhabited island in Croatia

See also
 Klobuchar (surname)

Croatian surnames
Slovene-language surnames